Li Hewen (born November 30, 1981 in Liaoning, China) is a Chinese professional pool player. He made it to the finals in the Vietnam leg of the 2006 WPA Asian Nine-ball Tour, but lost to Efren Reyes.

In 2006, Li Hewen reached the semi-finals of the WPA World Nine-ball Championship, which was the farthest ever achieved by a player from China. However, his run came to an end upon facing Ronato Alcano who would later win the title.

In 2007, Li Hewen along with Fu Jian-bo represented Team China in the World Cup of Pool where they won the title defeating Team Finland of Mika Immonen and Markus Juva.

Li contested the final of the 2012 WPA World Nine-ball Championship, however, he was defeated by Darren Appleton.

Titles
 2010 World Cup of Pool - with (Fu Jianbo)
 2009 Asian Indoor Games Nine-ball Singles 
 2007 World Cup of Pool - with (Fu Jianbo)

References

1981 births
Living people
Chinese pool players
Sportspeople from Liaoning
Cue sports players at the 2010 Asian Games
Cue sports players at the 2006 Asian Games
Asian Games competitors for China